José Manuel Meca García (born 19 January 1978), commonly known as Meca, is a retired Spanish footballer who played as a forward.

Career statistics

Club

Notes

References

1978 births
Living people
Spanish footballers
Association football forwards
Real Madrid Castilla footballers
Real Madrid CF players
Cultural Leonesa footballers
Elche CF players
Racing de Ferrol footballers
Real Jaén footballers
UD Lanzarote players
UDA Gramenet footballers
Orihuela CF players
CF Atlético Ciudad players
Lorca Atlético CF players
Segunda División B players
Segunda División players
La Liga players